Arthur George Klein (August 8, 1904 – February 20, 1968) was an American lawyer, jurist, and politician who served eight terms as a United States Representative from New York during the mid-20th century. He also served as a justice on the New York Supreme Court from 1957 to 1968.

Biography
Arthur G. Klein was born in New York City on August 8, 1904. He attended public schools and Washington Square College of New York University at New York City. He graduated from the law department of New York University in 1926.

Early career 
He was admitted to the bar in 1927, and commenced practice in New York City. He was connected with the U.S. Securities and Exchange Commission in Washington, D.C., and New York City between 1935 and 1941.

Congress 
He was elected as a Democrat to the Seventy-seventh Congress to fill the vacancy caused by the death of M. Michael Edelstein. He was reelected to the Seventy-eighth Congress and served from July 29, 1941, to January 3, 1945. He was not a candidate for renomination in 1944, He was elected to the Seventy-ninth Congress to fill the vacancy caused by the resignation of Samuel Dickstein and then reelected in 1946 to the Eightieth and to the four succeeding United States Congresses and served from February 19, 1946, until his resignation December 31, 1956.

New York Supreme Court 
He was elected to the New York State Supreme Court for the term commencing January 1, 1957, and served until his death.

Death

He died in New York City February 20, 1968, and is interred in Mount Moriah Cemetery in Fairview, Bergen County, New Jersey.

See also
List of Jewish members of the United States Congress

References

New York Times, Justice Arthur G. Klein Is Dead, February 22, 1968

1904 births
1968 deaths
Jewish members of the United States House of Representatives
New York University School of Law alumni
New York (state) lawyers
New York Supreme Court Justices
Democratic Party members of the United States House of Representatives from New York (state)
20th-century American lawyers
20th-century American politicians
20th-century American judges
Burials at Mount Moriah Cemetery (Fairview, New Jersey)
20th-century American Jews